FLL may refer to:

 FIRST Lego League, an international competition for elementary and middle school students
 Fort Lauderdale – Hollywood International Airport, in Florida, United States
 Four Letter Lie, an American post-hardcore band
 Frequency-locked loop
 Lebanese Liberation Front